Chloe East (born February 16, 2001) is an American actress and dancer. She starred as Willow Pierce in the first season of the Audience Network television series Ice, as Reece in the 2017–2018 ABC television series Kevin (Probably) Saves the World, and as Naomi in HBO Max's Generation. She appears as Monica Sherwood in Steven Spielberg's 2022 film, The Fabelmans.

Personal life
East was born in 2001 in San Clemente, California. She has two brothers. She began dancing at age 2, and has won many awards as a dancer. Soon after she began taking acting classes, she landed the part of Gloria in Fredrick Knott's "Wait Until Dark" in Newport Beach.

Career
East began modeling at age 9, and at 11 she started acting in the HBO television series True Blood. Other credits include Jessica Darling in the film adaptation of Jessica Darling's IT List, and the recurring role of Val on Disney Channel series Liv and Maddie. In 2016, East was cast as Willow Pierce in the first season of the Audience Network drama television series Ice.

In March 2017, East was cast as Reece, the niece to Kevin, in the ABC drama television series Kevin (Probably) Saves the World, which aired in the 2017–2018 television season. In mid-2018, she was cast in the dancing film Next Level, which was released in 2019. In 2020, she appeared as Jenna in the film The Wolf of Snow Hollow. In 2021, East was cast in the Steven Spielberg coming-of-age drama film The Fabelmans, which was released in 2022. The same year, she was cast in the upcoming film Going Places. In September 2022, East wrapped filming on the upcoming family comedy film Popular Theory.

Filmography

References

External links 

 
 

21st-century American actresses
American child models
Living people
Female models from California
American television actresses
People from San Clemente, California
2001 births
American child actresses
Dancers from California
Actresses from California
21st-century American dancers